Futagawa Dam  is a gravity dam located in Hokkaido Prefecture in Japan. The dam is used for power production. The catchment area of the dam is 878.4 km2. The dam impounds about 25  ha of land when full and can store 1620 thousand cubic meters of water. The construction of the dam was started on 1976 and completed in 1979.

References

Dams in Hokkaido